Brandon Creek is also a hamlet near Littleport, Cambridgeshire

Brandon Creek is a small village located on the Dingle Peninsula, Ireland.

According to the 9th century document "Voyage of St Brendan the Navigator", Saint Branden set sail westward from this point in the 6th century, and traveled across the Atlantic.

Adventurer Tim Severin took a five-man crew across the Atlantic to prove that St Brendan's voyage would have been possible in the 6th century. The journey departed in May 1976 from Brandon Creek.

References

Towns and villages in County Kerry